= Center for Student Missions =

CSM: City. Service. Mission.
- Formation: 1988
- Type: Christian missions
- Headquarters: Philadelphia, Pennsylvania
- Location(s): Boston, Chicago, Denver, Houston, Los Angeles, Nashville, New York City, Philadelphia, San Francisco, Detroit, and Washington, DC
- President: Dan Reeve
- Website: http://www.csm.org

The Center for Student Missions (CSM) is a Christian mission organization.

== History ==
CSM began in 1988. Instead of traveling to a different country and creating their own ministry, groups are brought into urban centers throughout North America and partnered with ministries in the city.
